Gender advertisement refers to the images in advertising that depict stereotypical gender roles and displays. The effects of advertising on body image have been studied by researchers ranging from psychologists to marketing professionals. Advertisements contain messages about physical attractiveness and beauty; examples which include commercials for clothes, cosmetics, weight reduction, and physical fitness. Researchers have conducted studies in an attempt to see what effects, if any, such advertisements have on teenage body image.

Creation and maintenance of gender normality 

Advertising is a significant agent of socialization in modern industrialized societies, and is used as a tool to maintain certain social constructions, such as gender. Men and women are depicted as differing in attitudes, behavior, and social statuses. These images are crafted to mimic real life and many mistake the concepts of fantasy and reality in regards to advertising. Erving Goffman uses the term "commercial realism" for advertisers' attempts to present the advertising world in ways which it could be real.

Role of gender in advertising 
It is argued that these images could be teaching the viewers a vast array of social cues, and even the most subtle ones make an impact on the viewers.

Social pressure on men to endorse traditional masculinity and sexuality in advertising 
Since the 1980s, men's bodies have been used more frequently in advertising, depicting a similarly idealized body image to that portrayed of women. Research suggests that men feel social pressure to endorse traditional masculine male models in advertising. Research by Martin and Gnoth  (2009) found that feminine men preferred feminine models in private, but stated a preference for the traditional masculine models when their collective self was salient. In other words, when concerned about being classified by other men as feminine, feminine men endorsed traditional masculine models. The authors suggested this result reflected the social pressure on men to endorse traditional masculine norms. Researchers, such as Mary Martin and James Gentry, have found that teen advertising negatively impacts teenagers' self-esteem by setting unrealistic expectations for them about their physical appearances through the use of idealized models. It has been argued by Dworkin and Wachs (2009) that the widespread image of the 'healthy' and 'fit' bodies used by the media, exemplified by the muscular man and the slim woman promote the idea of an ideal and 'singular' body-type that should be strived after by both genders, but which may not fit with the reality of the disparity of body types. Studies show that these ideals have influences on the expectancies of what a healthy body constitutes in young people and can contribute positive mental health issues in regard to body image. Other researchers, such as Heidi Posavac, acknowledge this, but believe that this only applies to teenagers who already possess low self-esteem or a poor self-images. Further, a growing number of advertisements are showing men as sex objects. A study on male body obsession found that advertisements for everything from cars to underwear depicted bodybuilder images with "washboard abdominal muscles, massive chests, and inflated shoulders, a mixture of muscularity and leanness probably attainable only by drugs". In contrast, researchers, including Terry Bristol, have found teenagers to be generally unaffected by these advertisements due to the idea that repeat exposure can create an immunity to images and messages in advertisements. Moreover, some researchers, such as Paul Humphreys, have concluded that exposure to such advertisements can actually create higher self-esteem in teenagers. Though women's equality is advancing in society, men have become more fixated with muscularity because it is still seen as a cultural symbol of masculinity. In addition, it has been suggested that a muscular body has become an aesthetic norm for heterosexuals as well as homosexuals.

In a content analysis study of exclusively male images in men's magazines, it was found that most of the bodies in advertising were not 'ordinary', but those of strong and hard 'male figures'. The study showed that males in the advertisements were usually objectified and depersonalized.

The representation of ectomorphs (thin and lightly muscled) was limited predominantly to the advertising of clothing that may look more appealing on slimmer, taller men. Endomorphs (soft and round) were rarely depicted and if they were, tended to be the object of humour. It is important to note that representations of male bodies are often used irrespective of their relevance to the product being promoted.

A study published in JAMA Pediatrics in January shows concerns about physique and muscularity in particular, among young males are "relatively common". The researchers said approximately 18 percent of participants in their study (which included 5,527 males) were "extremely concerned for their weight and physique". Furthermore, the researchers found 7.6 percent of young males were "very concerned about muscularity" and were using techniques that could be harmful to obtain an ideal body.

Femininity in advertising 

Women are usually placed in positions of submission--for instance, women are shown lying on the floor as men are standing over them, literally depicting women as being beneath men.  Women are urged to pursue beauty and sex appeal, and part of the sex appeal is submission.

Gender displays in advertising 
In Gender Advertisements, Erving Goffman states: "If gender is defined as the culturally established correlates of sex (whether in consequence of biology or learning) then gender display refers to conventionalized portrayals of those correlates." Goffman argues that there are codes which can be used to identify gender. These codes of gender can be seen in the portrayals of men and women in advertising. There are four categories under which we can see these codes of gender: the family, the feminine touch, the ritualization of subordination, and licensed withdrawal.

Multiple studies research on how specific genders are portrayed in advertisements. One of such studies, Gender-Role Portrayals in Television Advertising Across the Globe, a 2016 article written by Jörg Matthes, Karoline Adam, and Michael Prieler, underwent a comprehensive study of 13 countries' samples of advertisements and researched various aspects of their construction. The study found that in all sampled advertisements with a "primary character", 50.7% of the roles were held by women, with only 2 of the countries studied, Brazil and South Korea, having percentage pairs of one gender higher than 60% and the other lower than 40%. The study also found that in all sampled advertisements with a "voiceover", 61.8% of them were roles played by exclusively males, with only 2 of the countries studied, France and the United Kingdom, having women with more exclusive voiceovers in the sampled advertisements than men.

A 2010 study on marketing entitled, Is Advertising a barrier to male movement toward gender change?, analyzed commercials during programs targeted to different audiences to examine the portrayal of gender roles to different consumers. The study concluded that in the majority of the different programs and subsequent target audiences researched, men were portrayed with traditionally masculine roles and properties. For example, research found more than 100 advertisements during sports coverage targeted towards men portrayed men as a part of a family, but only 7 of those portrayed said men with emotional aspects and connections with the children in their family. The study also found that in 225 advertisements directed towards children, 7 of them portrayed the role of a father, with 20 of them portraying the role of a mother. Furthermore, the same study found that in 200 commercials during programming directed towards women, only 2 of the advertisements depicted fathers in a supportive role with children.

Role reversal 
Sometimes the traditional gender roles are reversed. When this happens, one can see men behaving in ways that are generally associated with femininity, and women behaving in typically masculine ways. This is often the case in gay and lesbian advertising. Witnessing these ads can be a shock to most, as they are not accustomed to this reversal of roles. This is an indicator that there is in fact a distinction between the genders in advertising.

Effects of advertisements 
Beauty can be defined largely as a perception. It is a group of social norms that interpret a particular form of appearance that is valued. Since almost four decades ago, women have been expected to conform to a particular body image and to behave in a certain manner of which would ultimately decipher and enforce their femininity (Bordo, 1997, p. 94). Both men and women strive to achieve this beauty which influences them to shape themselves and alter their appearance in order to conform to those norms. These norms are largely derived from the media's presentation of models and well known stars through advertisements for products and magazine covers. As our society is now filled with these advertisements in all aspects of life, such as on TV, billboards, in supermarkets displayed with the products (particularly beauty products) and on social media, children are now viewing this material at a younger age and in turn creating the perception that this is the ideal appearance whilst they are still very impressionable. Young children learn by observing and imitating what is presented to them.

It is very common for young men and women to compare themselves to models in ads, in terms of their physical attractiveness. The appearance and body size of the models within the advertisements in the final image seen by consumers are, more often than not, altered through editing programs such as Photoshop, in order to achieve the perfect (or impossible) desired look.  The use of these images creates a false beauty ideal for both men and women to aspire to, as well as creating the use of extreme dieting and surgical procedures in order to resemble a similar image that is displayed in advertising. This emphasis on an ideal body appearance has been regarded as being psychologically detrimental to the well-being of many young men and women, and on their self-image. The extant research shows that stereotypes can be helpful or detrimental, depending on several factors, such as the gender attitudes of the audience.

Magazine advertisements highlighting a thin, attractive female model yield greater self-objectification and the process of inspecting this type of advertisement can encourage women to think about their physical appearance as if looking on as a critical observer. Images from the media are frequently exposed to Western women, and the usage of skinny idealized women in advertising is prevalent. Data also shows that males who were exposed to advertisements of women being sexually objectified were more likely to believe stereotypes about sex roles as well as rape myth beliefs.

Body image in advertising 

The impact of media on body image has been closely studied in the past years, today, the prevalence of sexual content in media has become increasingly high. , the average teenager in the U.S. consumes 3–4 hours of television a day, 30% of that being advertisements, and many adolescents are consuming 100 or more advertisements a day. With the rise of social media, online advertisements have also become increasingly abundant. Many advertisements depict people with idealized bodies, many of which are photoshopped. The average female model in the U.S. is a size 0 or 00 and is between the age of 14 and 19 years of age while the average woman living in the U.S. wears sizes 12–14. The models shown in many advertisements have bodies that are genetically unattainable.

Studies have shown that consuming advertisements that contain ideal body image leads to an increase in body dissatisfaction, especially in young girls. Regardless of gender, self-objectification when viewing ideal body images in media may lead to negative feelings towards one's body. A 2015 research study revealed that these negative feelings may occur after observing an advertisement for only 3 minutes, specifically advertisements regarding the sexualization of both men and women.  Thinking of one's body from an outside viewer's perspective may also lead to body shame, appearance anxiety, and in some cases contributes to certain eating disorders. In the context of women advertisement, the image demonstrates an individual need that can be fulfilled through the women's participation in commodity culture (Nelson, 2013).  It must be noted that body-image meaning-transfer can be a lifelong process underlying the perpetual changes in the sociocultural environment, its cultural meaning, body-image trends, and pervasive media beauty ideologies (Yu et al. 2011).

Gender stereotypes and roles 
People organize their knowledge about the world around them by sorting and simplifying received information. Therefore, they create cognitive schemes, which are certain representations of the reality displaying its most typical and fundamental elements and properties. These schemes are responsible for defining the essence of our worldview and have a significant influence on social cognition – understanding, anticipation, situation and emotion control.

Gender roles have also been impacted by the media and advertising. SlutWalk is one phenomenon that emerges through incontemporary "third-wave feminism". The SlutWalk movement helps increase victim visibility and reintroduce sexual violence issues to the public. Gender roles within media and advertising have also been impacted by sex and relationship commitments. Men have positive attitudes toward casual and recreational sex, whereas women value the emotional intimacy and commitment around a sexual relationship. Difficulties in differentiating gender roles in the modern societies can be a perfect example of the negative social effects of using stereotypes. A division of gender roles is deeply rooted in today's society. Through the ages men have been considered to be financial providers, career-focused, assertive and independent, whereas women have been shown as low-position workers, loving wives and mothers, responsible for raising children and doing housework. Nowadays a family model is based rather on a partnership than on patriarchy and women have more rights and possibilities on the labor market. Feminist environment had a significant impact on the change in this situation. Women's liberation movement fought for the rights of women and for redefining traditional gender roles. Although females and males are still not equal, the differences between gender are not so vast anymore. Nevertheless, many social institutions, such as mass media, still use gender stereotypes, based on the assumption that they are well known to everyone and help the receivers to understand the content of the message.

Gender roles in media and advertising is impacted by humor. Advertising frequently uses gender roles to promote products. There are various stereotypes in regards to humorous advertising with both males and females. Stereotypes can product oversimplified conceptions and misapplied knowledge evaluations. Humor is generated on two steps. First, some kind of incongruity that violates a predominating view has to be recognized and, second, if people cognitively resolve this incongruity, they experience humor. Humor occurs when it seems that things are normal, while at the same time something goes wrong that breaks our expectations. Men could be depicted in domestic roles doing chores, whereas women would be presented in independent roles. This would break our expectation and society norms that revolve around the gender roles. Exaggerating these gender norms would have a potential to be humorous.

Gender displays in toys 
Parallels can be seen in historical changes of gender roles in North American society and to the amount of gender-typing in toys. Weisgram & Dinella provide a concise history of gender typing in the toy industry starting with archaeological evidence through artifacts that simulated gender roles that these ancient children would have as adults. Children used these toys to practice skills they would need to survive as adults, in the society and time they lived in. Further along, with advances in automation and plastic production, children had more time outside of household chores to play recreationally and the toy industry boomed. While there was no longer a need to simulate the gender roles for survival, the society the children lived in at the time was still heavily divided by gender. 
Shifting gender roles in North American society during the second half of the 20th century saw slight decreased emphasis on domesticity in feminine toys. As more women entered the workforce, gender-targeted marketing of toys decreased dramatically, with less the 2% of toys marketed towards boys or girls. However, in the 1980s and continuing into the 21st century, an increase in gender-typed marketing with both explicit and implicit labels are being used to exaggerate the segmented toy markets creating deep stereotypes around gender typed toys. Even among previously gender-neutral toys there is a shift into making different versions of the same toy. Recently though, there has been many movements to remove these explicit and implicit labels from toys and bedding sections of stores.

Advertising strategy 
Media and advertising has also taken a strategic role in today's society. Women's behavioral intention is enhanced more through a transformation message strategy than an information message strategy. However, a man's behavioral intention is an information message strategy as opposed to a behavioral intention. Advertisements rarely portray people that look like "us", or the norm. Women are frail, thin, and often are edited or "touched up" to look thinner and flawless. The people at whom advertisements are aimed rarely look the same as those portrayed in the advertisements themselves. The Females process self-efficacy and behavioral intention emotionally rather than rationally like males do. Another gender difference that has emerged is consumer effectiveness and message strategy significantly predicted self-efficacy. These findings show a gender role within media and advertising.

Research suggests that there are four different and independent components. They are trait descriptors (self-assertion, concern for others), physical characteristics (hair length, body height), role behaviors (leader, taking care of children), and occupational status (truck driver, elementary school teacher, housewife). Each component has a masculine and a feminine version. Stereotyping becomes problematic when stereotypes lead to expectations and judgements that restrict life opportunities for subject of a social category. This is the reason why public policy is concerned about marketing activities that promote stereotypes. Each gender stereotype component can lead to negative consequences that restrict life opportunities, particularly for women. Physical characteristics can lead to reduced self-dignity, role behaviors may lead to restricted opportunities of self-development, and stereotyping of occupational roles may lead to disadvantages in women's careers.

Gender in television advertisements 
Advertising involves thoughts, attitudes, and values, thus providing it a "cultural form" through the symbolic practice. Advertisements also play a role in the economic organization of modern society.   By studying gender roles in advertising, definitions and expectations of gender in media can be elucidated and understood better. Despite global attitudes toward them changing, gender stereotypes continue to be presented in advertisements.

The gender role in advertising is developing into a research field closely related to current society and culture. Different cultures, countries, and communities want to convey different gender images. Overall, men are more likely to be described as successful and powerful; women are more likely to be described as sexy or good at doing housework. However, there are many differences in the images of men and women in different cultures. The research shows that gender stereotypes are common in TV advertisements. For example, more women are depicted as young people, usually being watched at home. Male actors usually dress formally, while females often wear suggestive clothes. Men dominate the narrator, and the product category is closely related to gender. The following shows the impact of television advertising on gender images in four countries：

The United States 
A study analyzed the gender representation differences of 394 Spanish and English TV advertisements in the United States in 2013. The results show that gender stereotypes are common in both samples. For example, more women are depicted as young people, usually at home. Males usually dress formally, while females often wear suggestive clothes. Men obviously dominate the narrator role, and product category is closely related to gender. From the perspective of social cognitive theory, advertisements rarely depict women in the workplace, which may decrease interest in jobs traditionally related to the opposite sex.

In Spanish and English advertising samples, women wear more suggestive and sexy clothing than men, and men are more fully dressed. In addition, narrators were more often male in English (male: 65.1%; female: 34.9%) and Spanish TV advertisements (male: 73.7%; female: 26.3%). The age of the protagonist has obvious gender division. More women are younger than men. Society is more tolerant of men's aging. Sexual objectification of women may lead to anxiety, depression, and eating disorders. Women often compare their bodies to idols like models and celebrities, which lead to dissatisfaction with their body.

Britain 
Historically, Britain has set much higher standards for regulating the advertising industry. Advertisers and the government are pursuing gender role equality. Among British advertisements, there were no significant differences in the roles occupied by male and female lead characters. Females appear in business or professional settings and mentake on family responsibilities. In British advertisements from 2000 to 2001, the distribution of advertising clues of men (52%) and women (48%) was similar. There were 61% of male leads playing professional roles, compared to 39% of women.

It is now illegal to use gender stereotypes to sell goods in Britain. Britain’s Advertising Standards Authority announced the ban in December 2019. The new regulation stipulates that “advertisements must not include gender stereotypes that are likely to cause harm, or serious or widespread offense”, and also cannot show people “failing to achieve a task specifically because of their gender”. For example, the advertisers cannot show women having poor driving skills or men struggling with housework in advertisements.

Saudi Arabia 
Saudi Arabia, which has one of the fastest growing markets for advertising, operates strictly according to Islamic law, and men and women enjoy different rights; women may appear on TV only in limited roles. In practice, women are depicted in a more dependent and submissive position, while men are more authoritative and controlling. This phenomenon has led to a reduction in the types of products advertised by women. Women are emphasized in decorative features in traditional family roles. Most narrators tend to be male, and women are less likely to appear in professional situations or the workplace than men.

The environments and occasions in which men and women appear are also very different. Women are more often shown around their families and indoors, whereas men are depicted outdoors, in the workplace or as leaders. The age range is very important in Saudi Arabia's advertisements because Islamic dress codes for women are more strict from adolescence. In Saudi advertisements analyzed between 2000 and 2001, 53% of the advertisements showed men in leading roles. 88% of family roles where played by females. Of advertisements containing professional roles, 78% were filled by males, compared to 22% by females.

Gender in print advertisements 
Advertising involves ideas and values and gives them a cultural form through symbolic practice.  Since things rarely have one single and fixed meaning, it needs cultural participants give them meaning. Advertising needs "shared meaning" as part of its construction and production. Modern print advertising depends on images. Images are kinds of symbols, which can convey meaning as effectively as language symbols. 

Goffman mentioned that women are weakened by advertising portrayals in five categories: relative size, feminine touch, function ranking ritualization of subordination, and licensed withdrawal.

See also 
 Criticism of advertising
 Effects of advertising on teen body image
 Exploitation of women in mass media
 Gender Advertisements
 Killing Us Softly
 Media and gender
 Sex in advertising

References

External links 

Advertising
Gender roles
Communication
Sexual attraction